Ophryosporus densiflorus is a flowering shrub in the family Asteraceae. It is found only in Ecuador. Its natural habitat is subtropical or tropical dry forests. It is threatened by habitat loss.

References

densiflorus
Flora of Ecuador
Near threatened plants
Taxonomy articles created by Polbot